The Moir Gardens (35 acres) are botanical gardens located within the Outrigger Kiahuna Plantation, 2253 Poipu Road, Poipu, Kauai, Hawaii. Just to the east is Poipu Beach Park. They are open daily without charge.

History 
The gardens were created in the 1930s by Alexandra Moir while her husband was manager of Hawaii's first sugarcane plantation, Koloa Plantation, near the site. By 1948 the private gardens were reportedly identified as "one of the ten best cactus and succulent gardens in the world." They opened to the public in 1954.

Collection 

Today the garden contains rare cactus and succulents, bromeliads, orchids, mature trees, and water lily ponds.

See also 
 List of botanical gardens in the United States

References

External links
 

Botanical gardens in Hawaii
Protected areas of Kauai
Cactus gardens
1930s establishments in Hawaii